New Zealand Energy Corporation (NZEC) is an oil and gas producing company in New Zealand, established in 2010. It owns and operates gas and oil fields in Taranaki and has exploration permits in the East Coast Basin.

In 2013, NZEC purchased the Tariki, Waihapa and Ngaere mining licences and assets from Origin Energy.

References

External links

Official site

Oil and gas companies of New Zealand
New Zealand companies established in 2010